Fagelia is a genus of rove beetle in the family Staphylinidae. The genus Fagelia is endemic to Madagascar.

Species
The genus Fagelia comprises the following species:
 Fagelia descarpentriesi 
 Fagelia andohariana 
 Fagelia marositryana 
 Fagelia soror 
 Fagelia microcephala 
 Fagelia latipes 
 Fagelia cylindra 
 Fagelia vicina 
 Fagelia miniscula

References

Staphylinidae genera
Osoriinae